Pacatuba may refer to the following places in Brazil:

 Pacatuba, Sergipe
 Pacatuba, Ceará